The Indian Institute Library is a dependent library of the Bodleian and part of the University of Oxford in Oxford, England. Opened in 1886, the library specialises in the history and culture of South Asia, Tibet and the Himalayas. The Indian Institute and its library were originally based in the building on the corner of Holywell and Catte Street. It was subsequently occupied by the History Faculty and History Faculty Library. (The History Faculty moved to a location on George Street in 2007, and the History Faculty Library moved to the Bodleian's Radcliffe Camera in Aug 2012). Traces of the building's original function are still visible, including the gilded weathervane which depicts an elephant with a howdah.

In 1968, the library was relocated to a newly constructed 'penthouse' on the roof of the New Bodleian building. The move was not without controversy, since the original building had been constructed with the express intention of providing a permanent home to the institute.

The library remains on the top floor of the Bodleian, which results in the strange situation of a lending library being based within a reference library. The library's collection is of international importance and includes over 100,000 volumes. Around 60% of these are catalogued on OLIS, the Oxford University library catalogue. Anyone wishing to use the library must either be a student at the University of Oxford, or obtain a reader's card from the Bodleian Library. The library's reading room was closed on September 10, 2010. To access the books, readers have to request their delivery to other reading rooms of the Bodleian library.

References

1886 establishments in England
Indology
Libraries of the University of Oxford
Libraries established in 1886